Maria Garbowska-Kierczyńska (3 December 19222 January 2016) was a Polish film, stage and television actress, sometimes known as Marianna Garbowska. She began her career in 1946. She appeared in films such as Job, czyli ostatnia szara komórka (2006) and Aftermath (2012). Her television credits included Plebania and Ojciec Mateusz. She was a member of the National Theatre in Warsaw from 1969 to 1979. She was born in Garbów and later married Ryszard Kierczyński.

Death
Garbowska-Kierczyńska died on 2 January 2016 in Konstancin-Jeziorna, aged 93.

Filmography

Stage appearances

1946 Teatr Miejski, Lublin
 Fresh Paint! (1946)
 Godzina wieszczów (1946)

1947-49 Stefan Żeromski Theatre, Kielce
 Jutro pogoda (1947)
 Pani prezesowa (1947)
 Głupi Jakub (1948)
 Król włóczęgów (1948)
 Strzały na ulicy Długiej (1948)
 Jadzia wdowa (1948)
 All My Sons (1949) (Ann Deever)

1950-1968 Teatr Powszechny, Warsaw
 Gastello (1950)
 Moskiewski charakter (1950)
 Rozbitki (1950)
 Awans (1951)
 Niespokjna starość (1952)
 The Game of Love and Chance (1952) (Lisette)
 Proces (1953)
 The Cricket on the Hearth (1953)
 Niezwykła historia (1953)
 Imieniny pana dyrektora (1954)
 Zdarzenie (1954)
 Suchy kraj (1956)
 Podróż po Warszawie (1957)
 Klątwa (1957)
 The Rainmaker (play) (1958) (Lizzie Curry)
 Under Milk Wood (1959) (Lily Smalls)
 Lysistrata (1959) (Nikodike)
 The Caucasian Chalk Circle (1960)
 Król w kraju rozkoszy (1960)
 Resurrection (play) (1961) (Dróżniczka)
 Zaczarowany las (1961)
 Heloise and Abelard (1962)
 Skandal w Hellbergu (1962)
 The Three Musketeers (1963)
 Wesele (1963)
 Crime and Punishment  (1964)
 Stefan (1964)
 Pastorałka (1964)
 Kolumbowie rocznik 20 (1965)
 Śmierć Dantona (1968)

1969
 Nieboska komedia (1969)

1970-99
 Kordian (1970)
 The Threepenny Opera (1970)
 Beniowski (1971)
 Three Sisters (play) (1971) (The Servant)
 Wesele (1974)
 Białe małżeństwo (1975)
 Dziady cz.III i Ustęp (1978)
 Jan Maciej Karol Wścieklica (1979)

1980–99
 Nowe Wyzwolenie (1984)

References

External links
 

1922 births
2016 deaths
20th-century Polish actresses
21st-century Polish actresses
People from Lublin County
Polish film actresses
Polish stage actresses
Polish television actresses